Ichillin' (stylized as ICHILLIN') is a seven-member South Korean girl group formed by KM Entertainment in 2021. The group is currently composed of seven members: Jiyoon, E.Ji, Jackie, Joonie, Chaerin, Yeju and Chowon. Former member Sohee had left the group on July 15, 2022.

The group made their debut on September 8, 2021, with the digital single "Got'Ya".

Name
Ichillin' is a combination of the words Aisling, which has the meaning of dream and vision, and Chillin, which has the meaning of relaxing or coolness. The combination is made in hopes of encouraging the listeners of their music to dream and relax.

History

2021: Debut with Got'Ya and comeback with Fresh

Ichillin' was to debut on August 25, 2021, but it was delayed in order to show more completeness in the group through improvements on the album. The group subsequently made their debut with their first digital single "Got'Ya" on September 8, 2021, two weeks after the supposed debut date.

The group then had their first comeback on November 11 the same year with their second digital single "Fresh".

2022: Bridge of Dreams, changes to the group and Draw (My Time)

The group released their first extended play Bridge of Dreams on April 27, 2022, with "Play Hide & Seek" serving as the album's title track. The group then followed up promotions for "Play Hide & Seek" with one of the EP's tracks "La Luna", beginning June 11 the same year.

On July 15, KM Entertainment announced that Sohee would be leaving the group, after discussions between the two parties. On October 25, it was confirmed that Jeong Ji-yoon, who had took part in Girls Planet 999, would join the group.

The group was set to release their third digital single "Draw (My Time)" on November 3, however it was postponed to November 10, in light of the Seoul Halloween crowd crush.

2023: Challenger
The group will release their fourth digital single "Challenger" on March 23, 2023, with "Alarm" serving as the title track.

Members

Current
 Jiyoon (지윤)
 E.Ji (이지) – Leader
 Jackie (재키)
 Joonie (주니)
 Chaerin (채린)
 Yeju (예주)
 Chowon (초원)

Former
 Sohee (소희)

Discography

Extended plays

Singles

Filmography

Web shows

Concerts
 Your Time (2022)

Ambassadorship
 Honorary Ambassador for Kosunnae Abandoned Animal Welfare Association (2022)

References

South Korean girl groups
2021 establishments in South Korea
Musical groups established in 2021
Musical groups from Seoul
K-pop music groups
South Korean dance music groups
South Korean pop music groups